Evgeni Vasilevich Duleyev (born 5 April 1956 in Moscow) is a Russian rower who competed for the Soviet Union in the 1976 Summer Olympics and in the 1980 Summer Olympics.

In 1976 he was a crew member of the Soviet boat which won the silver medal in the quadruple sculls event.

Four years later he and his partner Aleksandr Fomchenko finished fifth in the double sculls competition.

References

External links
 

1956 births
Living people
Russian male rowers
Soviet male rowers
Olympic rowers of the Soviet Union
Rowers at the 1976 Summer Olympics
Rowers at the 1980 Summer Olympics
Olympic silver medalists for the Soviet Union
Olympic medalists in rowing
World Rowing Championships medalists for the Soviet Union
Medalists at the 1976 Summer Olympics